The Walla Walla Padres were the primary name of a minor league baseball team in the northwest United States, located in Walla Walla, Washington. Named after their parent club, the Padres were members of the Class A short-season Northwest League for ten years, from 1973 through 1982.

History
In 1969, with the expansion of Major League Baseball, Walla Walla sought the prospect of bringing professional baseball to the community. On January 12, 1969 it was announced that the Walla Walla Valley Baseball Club had officially been awarded membership into the Northwest League  The franchise played three seasons as an affiliate of the Philadelphia Phillies until 1971. In 1972, in an odd arrangement, the club played as an affiliate of Triple-A Pacific Coast League Hawaii Islanders. Following the season, Walla Walla signed a player development contract with the San Diego Padres, who had previously partnered with Tri-City.

Adopting the namesake of their parent club, Walla Walla became the Padres. In their first season affiliated with the Padres, Walla Walla won the league title in 1973. The Padres claimed the Northwest League crown again in 1976, defeating the fabled Portland Mavericks two games to one in the championship series. Walla Walla sought a third title in 1979, but fell to the Central Oregon Phillies.

After years of declining attendance the franchise was sold following the 1982 season to New Jersey-based Big Six Sports. The new ownership group promptly moved the club west to Richland, rebranded them as the Tri-Cities Triplets, and signed a player development contract with the Texas Rangers. The San Diego Padres shifted their NWL  affiliate to Spokane, which had just lost its Triple-A team to Las Vegas. Professional baseball continued in Walla Walla with the independent Blue Mountain Bears in 1983, but after one season, they moved west and became the Everett Giants in 1984.

Early Walla Walla Baseball
The history of baseball in the Walla Walla Valley dates back to the late 19th century. The Walla Walla Walla Wallas of the Pacific Interstate League played in 1891. The Walla Wallas continued play in the 1908 Inland Empire League and the 1902 Inland Empire League team played with the nickname "Sharpshooters". In 1912 the Western Tri-State League was formed with the Walla Walla Bears playing in the circuit for three season before disbanding.

Ballpark
Walla Walla teams played at Borleske Stadium, located at 409 West Rees Avenue in Walla Walla, Washington. The stadium is still in use today.

Season-by-season record

Notable players
Two future hall of famers played for the team: shortstop Ozzie Smith (1977) and outfielder Tony Gwynn (1981). Their NWL batting averages were .301 for Smith and .331 for Gwynn.

Other future major leaguers included Joe McIntosh (1974–1975), Eric Show (1978), Ron Tingley (1977–1978), Bob Geren (1979–1980), Mark Parent (1979), Greg Booker (1981), John Kruk (1981), Jimmy Jones (1982), Gene Walter (1982) and Mitch Williams (1982). Gene Walter (1982), and Mitch Williams (1982). Geren and Parent both became managers with different teams (Geren with the Oakland A's of MLB and Parent with the Chico Outlaws of the Golden Baseball League).

Notable alumni

Baseball Hall of Fame alumni

Tony Gwynn (1981), inducted 2007
Ozzie Smith (1977), inducted 2002

Other notable alumni
 Greg Booker (1981)
 Bob Geren (1979–1980)
 Andy Hawkins (1978)
 Dane Iorg (1971)
 Bob Jones (1912) 
 Jimmy Jones (1982)
 John Kruk (1981) 3 x MLB All-Star
 Mark Parent (1979)
 Earl Sheely (1913-1914)
 Eric Show (1978)
 Ron Tingley (1977–1978)
 Tom Trebelhorn (1972) 
 Gene Walter (1982)
 Mitch Williams (1982) MLB All-Star

References

External links
 Stats Crew Walla Walla Padres
 Walla Walla Padres year-by-year records, statistics and rosters at The Baseball Cube
 Baseball Reference – Walla Walla teams

Defunct Northwest League teams
Walla Walla, Washington
Baseball teams established in 1973
Baseball teams disestablished in 1982
San Diego Padres minor league affiliates
Professional baseball teams in Washington (state)
Defunct baseball teams in Washington (state)